Nicolás Pasquini (born 2 January 1991) is an Argentine professional footballer who plays as a left-back for Argentine Primera División club Lanús.

Career
Pasquini began his youth career with Club San Carlos, prior to joining Lanús' system in 2006. In July 2010, Pasquini joined Primera B Metropolitana side Atlanta on loan for two seasons. In his first season, 2010–11, he featured six times as Atlanta won the title and promotion to Primera B Nacional for 2011–12. In tier two, he played seventeen times in a season which ended with relegation. He returned to Lanús in June 2012 and subsequently made his professional debut in the Copa Argentina on 17 April 2013 versus Atlético de Rafaela. His Argentine Primera División debut arrived a month later against Tigre.

One hundred and twenty-two appearances in all competitions followed in his first six seasons with Lanús as the club won the 2013 Copa Sudamericana, the 2016 Argentine Primera División, the 2016 Copa Bicentenario and the 2016 Supercopa Argentina. Over that period, Pasquini scored six times including his first in a league match with Olimpo on 2 September 2013.

Career statistics
.

Honours
Atlanta
Primera B Metropolitana: 2010–11

Lanús
Copa Sudamericana: 2013
Argentine Primera División: 2016
Copa Bicentenario: 2016
Supercopa Argentina: 2016

References

External links

1991 births
Living people
Sportspeople from Córdoba Province, Argentina
Argentine people of Italian descent
Argentine footballers
Association football defenders
Argentine Primera División players
Primera B Metropolitana players
Primera Nacional players
Club Atlético Lanús footballers
Club Atlético Atlanta footballers
Estudiantes de La Plata footballers